A mercy rule,  slaughter rule, knockout rule, or skunk rule ends a two-competitor sports competition earlier than the scheduled endpoint if one competitor has a very large and presumably insurmountable scoring lead over the other. It is called the mercy rule because it spares further humiliation for the loser. It is common in youth sports in North America, where running up the score is considered unsporting. It is especially common in  baseball and softball in which there is no game clock and a dominant team could in theory continue an inning endlessly.

The rules vary widely, depending on the level of competition, but nearly all youth sports leagues and high school sports associations and many college sports associations in the United States have mercy rules for sports including baseball, softball, American football and association football.

However, mercy rules usually do not take effect until a prescribed point in the game (like the second half of an association football game). Thus, one team, particularly if it is decidedly better than a weaker opponent, can still "run up the score" before the rule takes effect. For instance, in American football, one team could be ahead by 70 points with three minutes left in the first half; in baseball, the better team could have a 20-run lead in the second inning, but the game would still continue.

American football

Middle and high school football
At the middle- or high-school level, 34 states use a mercy rule that may involve a "continuous clock" (the clock continues to operate on most plays when the clock would normally stop, such as an incomplete pass) once a team has a certain lead (for example, 35 points) during the second half (Louisiana adopted a rule in 2022 which states the running clock is invoked when the margin reaches 42 points at any time during the game). That greatly decreases the amount of time taken for a game to complete, which reduces the leading team's chances to score more and the time that the trailing team must spend in facing an insurmountable deficit. In most states, the clock stops only for scores, timeouts (officials', injury, or charged), or the end of the quarter. Plays that would normally stop the clock, such as penalties, incomplete passes, going out of bounds, or change of possession, would not stop the clock. The rule varies by state; for example, the clock does not stop upon a score in Colorado, Indiana, Kansas (regular-season games only), or Missouri (fourth quarter only).

In most states, once the point differential is reduced to below the mercy rule-invoking amount, normal timing procedures resume until either the end of the game or the mercy rule-invoking point differential is re-established; in Colorado, Georgia, Kansas and Louisiana, the clock continues to run even if the differential falls below the threshold. Most states that have mercy rules waive this rule for a championship game.

In some states, coaches and game officials may choose to end a game at their own discretion at any time during the second half if the continuous clock rule is in effect; that usually happens if a lopsided margin continues to increase or if threatening weather is imminent. Sometimes the coach of the team that is losing agrees to shorten the length of a quarter in addition to the continuous clock rule. Although it is rare, some states or high school conferences have rules in which the team with a very large lead may not run a certain play for the rest of the game, such as a deep pass or outside run.

In some states (where 8-man and 6-man football is widely used), the rules call for a game to end when one team is ahead by a certain score (like 45 or 50 points) at halftime or any time thereafter. In other states with 6- or 8-man football, continuous clock rules are used, and the rule may be modified; for instance, in Iowa, the rule goes into effect if the 35-point differential is reached at any time after the first quarter.

In a variant on the mercy rule used in Connecticut high school football from 2006 to 2016, the team's coach was issued a one-game suspension (i.e., for the team's next game) if at any point the team had a 50-point lead. In 2016 it was replaced with a running clock rule.

College football

The National Collegiate Athletic Association's mercy rule provides, "Any time during the game, the playing time of any remaining period or periods and the intermission between halves may be shortened by mutual agreement of the opposing head coaches and the referee." (NCAA Football Rule 3-2-2-a) NCAA Football Approved Ruling 3-2-2-I cites an example: "At halftime the score is 56–0. The coaches and the referee agree that the third and fourth quarters should be shortened to 12 minutes each. The coaches also request that the second half be played with a 'running clock' i.e., that the game clock not be stopped." The NCAA Football Rules Committee determined, "The remaining quarters may be shortened to 12 minutes each. However, the 'running clock' is not allowed; normal clock rules apply for the entire game."

The most recent example of an NCAA football game shortened by invoking this rule occurred on October 1st, 2022 when the Syracuse Orange played the Wagner Seahawks. The mismatched Wagner team trailed the 4-0 Syracuse team 49-0 at halftime. In the second half coaches and the referee agreed to 10 minute quarters. Syracuse head coach Dino Babers made the controversial choice of leaving some of Syracuse's starting players in late into the second half. The final score of the game was 59-0.

September 1, 2018 the rule was enacted during a game Georgia played against Austin Peay in Athens Georgia.  With the score 45–0 in the 3rd quarter and a high heat index, the Austin Peay Coach Will Healy suggested to Georgia head coach Kirby Smart that they play a 10-minute fourth quarter instead of the typical 15 minute fourth quarter.  The coaches and referee agreed and the game was shortened.

September 24, 2016 the Missouri Tigers led Delaware State 58–0 at halftime. The coaches agreed to shorten the third and fourth quarters from 15 minutes to 10 minutes each, shortening the total game time from 60 minutes to 50 minutes. Missouri added three touchdowns in the abbreviated second half to make the final score 79–0, setting team records for the most points scored in a game (79), the greatest margin of victory (79), and the largest number of touchdowns scored (11).

Also in 2016, the game between Clemson and South Carolina State had both the third and fourth quarters shortened from 15 minutes to 12 as a result of  Clemson leading the game at half 45–0.  The final score of the game was 59–0.

Earlier in 2016, the game between Texas State and Arkansas saw the fourth quarter shortened to 10 minutes when severe thunderstorms were approaching Donald W. Reynolds Razorback Stadium. Arkansas led 42–3 at the end of the third quarter, and the final period was scoreless.  A similar scenario took place in 2017 in the game between TCU and Kansas, where the coaches agreed to a running clock for the final 12:49 of the game due to severe thunderstorms approaching Amon G. Carter Stadium.

In a 2013 game, Old Dominion University (ODU) was losing to the University of North Carolina (UNC) 80–20 when ODU coach Bobby Wilder asked for the fourth quarter to be shortened by five minutes, which UNC coach Larry Fedora agreed to. Fedora also directed his quarterback to take a knee on fourth and goal with 1:53 remaining to not run up the score.

In a 1988 game, Kansas Jayhawks coach Glen Mason asked if a running clock could be used after his team trailed 49–0 at halftime to the Auburn Tigers. Auburn coach Pat Dye and the officials agreed, and Auburn ended up a 56–7 winner.

Despite the NCAA Football Rules Committee's subsequent ruling (A.R. 3-2-2-I) that a "running clock" is not permitted, a continuous clock was used September 5, 2013, beginning in the fourth quarter when the Georgia Tech Yellow Jackets had a 63–0 lead against the Elon Phoenix. That was at the request of Elon coach Jason Swepson and agreed upon by Georgia Tech coach Paul Johnson. Georgia Tech won the game 70–0.

However, in the Mississippi Association of Community and Junior Colleges, a running clock is allowed if the team is ahead by 38 points or more. This rule, unique only to the MACJC, was instituted in 2013.

Soccer

International Blind Sports Federation rules require that any time during a game in which one team has scored ten more goals than the other team that game is deemed completed.

In U.S. high school soccer, most states use a mercy rule that ends the game if one team is ahead by 10 or more goals at any point from halftime onward.

Youth soccer leagues use variations on the rule.

Baseball and softball

International competitions are sanctioned by the World Baseball Softball Confederation (WBSC), formed by the 2013 merger of the International Baseball Federation (IBAF) and International Softball Federation (ISF).

In international baseball competition and the World Baseball Classic (WBC), games are ended when one team is ahead by 10 runs, once at least seven completed innings are played by the trailing team. In seven inning contests (women's competition and doubleheaders), the same applies after five innings of a seven-inning game.

The inaugural WBC in 2006 followed the IBAF mercy rule, with an additional rule stopping a game after five innings when a team is ahead by at least 15 runs. The mercy rules applied to the round-robin (now double-elimination) matches only, not to the semi-finals or final.

In a six-inning game such as Little League Baseball and Softball, rules call for the game to end if the winning team is ahead by 15 runs after three innings played or 10 runs after four innings played by the trailing team. In a seven-inning game at the intermediate level or higher, the corresponding run rule is applied for 15 runs after four innings, or 10 runs after five innings. Little League refers to this rule as the run rule, instead of the mercy rule.

Softball rules are different for fast/modified fast pitch and slow pitch. In WBSC-sanctioned competitions, the run-ahead rule (the WBSC terminology) is, for fast or modified fast pitch, 20 runs after three innings, 15 after four, or 8 after 5. In slow pitch, the margin is 20 runs after four innings or 15 after five.  The NCAA has also adopted the rule.

In regular season or conference tournament NCAA and NAIA college baseball, the IBAF rule may be implemented. Most NCAA conferences limit the rule to the final day of a series, for travel reasons, or primarily during conference tournaments where four to five games are played in a day, in order to allow the next game to start. The rule is not allowed in NCAA tournament play (regionals, super regionals and College World Series), in which all games must be at least nine innings.

In NCAA softball, the rule is invoked if one team is ahead by at least eight runs after five innings and, unlike with college baseball, applies in the NCAA tournament as well with the exception of the championship series. In American high school softball, most states use a mercy rule of 20 runs ahead in three innings or 10 in five innings. (In either case, if the home team is ahead by the requisite number of runs, the game will end after the top half of the inning.)

Most state high school associations (where games are seven innings) use the IBAF Women's rule after five innings have been played by the trailing team; some associations further the rule by ending a game after either three or four innings if the lead is at least 15 runs. For softball, the rule is 12 after three innings and 10 after five. However, since the home team has the last at-bat, the rules usually allow visiting teams to score an unlimited number of runs in the top half of an inning. That can be prevented by invoking the rule only after the home team has completed its half of the inning.

In Baseball5, a WBSC variation of baseball and softball which is played to five innings, a team which leads by 15 runs after three innings or 10 after four innings automatically wins.

Due to the untimed nature of innings, some leagues either impose caps on the number of runs that can be scored in one inning (usually in the 4-8 range) or limit the number of plate appearances in an inning (typically, such a limit will consist of one rotation of the batting order).  Such rules ensure that games will complete in a reasonable length of time, but it can also mean that a lead of a certain size becomes insurmountable by the cap, which can be prevented by not invoking the rule in such circumstances.

Basketball

In high school basketball, many states have a "continuous clock" rule, similar to American football, which takes effect in the second half after a lead grows to a prescribed point (in Iowa, 35 points or more; in Kansas, 30 points or more but only in the fourth quarter; in Louisiana, the rule is invoked at any time during the game when one team gains a 35-point lead). The clock stops only for charged, officials' or injury time-outs; or at the end of the third quarter. The clock would not stop when it would normally stop, such as for fouls, free throws, out-of-bounds plays or substitutions.

The rules vary when normal timing procedures take effect after a lead is diminished (such as because of the trailing team's rally); for instance, in Iowa, normal timing procedures are enforced if the lead is lowered to 25 points but re-instituted once the lead grows back to 35 or more points. By comparison, in Kansas, if the running clock is triggered, it will not stop except for a timeout or an injury even if the differential is reduced to under 30 points. As with other sports, some states offer provisions to allow a team to end the game early by mutual decision of the coaches (for instance, if a large lead continues to grow and the talent disparity is obvious).

Boxing

In amateur boxing, if a boxer trails by more than 20 points, the referee stops the fight and the boxer that is leading automatically wins; bouts which end this way may be noted as "RSC" (referee stopped contest) with notations for an outclassed opponent (RSCO), outscored opponent (RSCOS), injury (RSCI) or head injury (RSCH).

While a boxer who loses on the mercy rule is scored RSCO and would be similar to a technical knockout in professional boxing, it is not scored a loss by knockout, and the 28-day suspension for losing on a knockout does not apply.

Cricket

Cricket does not have any rules that terminate a game early based on one team's lead, since in most competitions, teams aim to win as big as possible in order to improve their net run rate, which helps them qualify if they tie with another team for the playoffs. However, first-class cricket has the follow-on rule, which allows the team that bats first, if they lead by a specified run margin after their opponents first innings, to require the opposing team to bat their second innings next. The first team may still have a second innings if their opponents combined innings' scores surpass their first innings score. Also, the rules allow a declaration to be called by a team during their innings to end the innings before ten wickets have fallen (10 outs). Either action can be taken if a team believes it would help them more quickly complete the conditions necessary to win within the time limit (up to five days).

Curling

In curling the loser team can concede at any time, except for international competitions, where they need to wait until the completion of the 6th end to do so (and 8th end in play-off games).

In curling conducted by Special Olympics Canada, games end if 6 ends have passed and one team leads by 10 points.

Goalball 

In the Paralympic team sport for the vision-impaired, goalball, a maximum goal difference is when 'any time one team has scored ten goals more than the team it is playing'.  The game ends immediately upon that goal.  This rule commenced on 1 January 2002.

Wrestling
In American collegiate wrestling and high school wrestling, a wrestler wins by technical fall, and the match ends, if he builds a 15-point lead. If a wrestler gains a 15-point lead by having his opponent in a near-fall, the referee will allow the offensive wrestler the opportunity to win by fall without liability to be reversed and pinned. The bout ends when a fall is awarded or the near-fall ends.

See also 
 Running out the clock

References

Sports terminology
Sportsmanship
Sports rules and regulations